The 2006 FIA GT Championship season is the 10th season of FIA GT Championship. It is a series for Grand Touring style cars broken into two classes based on power and manufacturer involvement, called GT1 and GT2. Invitational G2 and G3 classes are also allowed to participate, but do not count towards the championships. It began on 7 May 2006 and ended on the 18 November 2006 after 10 races.

Schedule

Entries

GT1

GT2

Season results
Overall winners in bold.

Teams Championship
Points are awarded to the top 8 finishers in the order of 10–8–6–5–4–3–2–1 except at the Spa 24 Hours, where half points are also granted for the leaders after 6 and 12 hours.  Both cars score points towards the championship regardless of finishing position.

GT1 Standings

GT2 Standings

Manufacturers Cup
Points are awarded to the top 8 finishers in the order of 10–8–6–5–4–3–2–1 except at the Spa 24 Hours.  All cars score points towards the championship regardless of finishing position.

GT1 Standings

GT2 Standings

Drivers Championship
Points are awarded to the top 8 finishers in the order of 10–8–6–5–4–3–2–1 except at the Spa 24 Hours.  Drivers who do not drive the car for a minimum distance do not score points.

GT1 Standings

GT2 Standings

References

External links

 Official FIA GT homepage

FIA GT Championship
 
FIA GT Championship seasons